Potemnemus ennevei is a species of beetle in the family Cerambycidae. It was described by de Jong in 1945. It is known from Indonesia.

References

Lamiini
Beetles described in 1945